Abuse of Power may refer to:

Abuse of power, the commission of an unlawful act in an official capacity
Abuse of Power (film), a 1971 Greek film directed by Stavros Tsiolis and starring Nikos Kourkoulos
Abuse of Power (novel), a 2011 American novel by Michael Savage
The Abuse of Power, a 1979 memoir by James Margach
Abuse of Power: The New Nixon Tapes, a 1997 book by Stanley Kutler

See also
Abusive power and control